T&A may refer to:

 Bradford Telegraph & Argus, a newspaper in Bradford, England
 T & A (professional wrestling), a former pro-wrestling tag team
 Tonsillectomy & adenoidectomy, two operations that are often performed together
 T&A Records
 T & A San Marino, the San Marino Baseball Club
 Little T&A, Rolling Stones song
 "T & A television", or "Jiggle television", a critical term
 Tanimura & Antle

See also
 TNA (disambiguation)
 Tits 'n Ass album by Golden Earring